Samīħ al-Qāsim al Kaissy (1939 – August 19, 2014) was a Palestinian Druze poet with Israeli citizenship whose work is well known throughout the Arab world. He was born in Transjordan and later lived in Mandatory Palestine and Israel. Before the Six-Day War in 1967 he was mainly influenced by Arab nationalism; after the war he joined the Israeli Communist Party.

Early life
Al-Qasim was born in 1939 in the Emirate of Transjordan (now Jordan), in the northern city of Zarqa, while his father served in the Arab Legion of King Abdullah. He came from a Druze family from the town of Rameh in the Upper Galilee. Al-Qasim attended primary school there and then later graduated from secondary school in Nazareth. His family did not flee Rameh during the 1948 Palestinian exodus (Nakba).<ref name="Saqi">A Bilingual Anthology of Arabic Poetry - Victims of A Map by Samih al-Qasim, Adonis, and Mahmoud Darwish. Al-Saqi Books 26 Westbourne Grove, London W2 1984</ref> In his book About Principles and Art, he explains:

While I was still at primary school the Palestinian tragedy occurred. I regard that date as the date of my birth, because the first images I can remember are of the 1948 events. My thoughts and images spring from the number 48.

Life as a poet and journalist
By 1984, al-Qasim had written twenty-four volumes of nationalist poetry and published six collections of poems. His poems in general are relatively short, some being no more than just two verses. Some of his famous poems include:Slit LipsSons of WarConfession at MiddayTravel TicketsBatsAbandoningThe Story of a CityConversation between Ear of Corn and Jerusalem Rose ThornHow I became an ArticleStory of the Unknown ManEnd of a Discussion with a JailerThe Will of a Man Dying in ExileThe Boring OrbitThe Clock on the Wall 
Al-Qasim contributed to the journals of Al-Ittihad, Al-Jadid, Index and others. He claimed that the pan-Arab ideology of Nasserism impressed him during the nationalist post-1948 era. Most of his poetry relates to the change of life before and after the Nakba, the Palestinian and broader Arab struggle to free their lands from foreign influence, Arab nationalism, and various Arab tragedies. In 1968, he published his first collection of poetry, Waiting for the Thunderbird. Al-Qasim wrote about these subjects while they were at the climax of their popularity among the Arab population in the later half of the 20th century. When asked by his Iraqi friend, poet Buland al-Haidari if he had visited Baghdad, he replied by saying he did not have to, since he views any Arab city as equal to his own Arab residence.

Political influence
Al-Qasim claims that the pan-Arab ideology of Nasserism impressed him during the nationalist post-1948 era. He was jailed several times for his political activities that have involved advocacy for Palestinian rights and dissent against government policies, starting in 1960 for refusal to enlist in the Israeli army which is required of Israeli Druze. He was also under house arrest. He joined the Israeli Communist party Hadash in 1967 and was detained along with other members of the party at the outbreak of the Six-Day War. He was sent to al-Damoun prison (official name: Damon Prison) in Haifa. During this time, he virtually lost his nationalistic emotions upon hearing Israeli radio announcing its territorial gains after their victory.

Life in Israel
Al-Qasim worked as a journalist in Haifa where he ran the Arabesque Press and the Folk Arts Centre and was the editor-of-chief of the Israeli Arab newspaper Kul al-Arab. He would recite many of his poems to large audiences at monthly gatherings in the Arab towns and cities of the Galilee. Al-Qasim refused to leave his homeland; in an interview with Index'' he is quoted as saying "I have chosen to remain in my own country not because I love myself less, but because I love my country more".

Al-Qasim visited Syria in 1997 and in 2000. He was prevented by Israeli authorities from leaving to Lebanon for a poetry event in 2001.

Death
Al-Qasim died on August 19, 2014, after a long battle with cancer. His funeral was held on August 21, 2014, in Rameh.

Notes

External links
 Sadder Than Water: New & Selected Poems by Samih al-Qasim, translated by Nazih Kassis, introduced by Adina Hoffman. 2006.
 Samih al-Qasim Biography
 English translation of Samih al-Qasim's Travel Tickets
Samih al-Qasim: Equal Parts Poetry and Resistance, by Shawqi Kassis,  Journal of Palestine Studies, Vol. 44, No. 2 (Winter 2015), pp. 43–51

1939 births
Israeli Arab nationalists
Palestinian Arab nationalists
Palestinian male poets
Arab citizens of Israel
Israeli Druze
2014 deaths
20th-century Palestinian poets
People from Zarqa
Deaths from cancer in Israel